Guettarda longiflora is a species of plant in the family Rubiaceae. It is endemic to Jamaica. It is threatened by habitat loss.

References

longiflora
Endemic flora of Jamaica
Critically endangered plants
Taxonomy articles created by Polbot